Sir George Stapylton Barnes, KCB, KCSI (8 February 1858 – 9 December 1946) was a British barrister and civil servant who served in the United Kingdom and in British India. The son of George Carnac Barnes, Foreign Secretary of India, he spent much of his career at the Board of Trade, where he rose to Joint Permanent Secretary in 1915. He was a member of the Viceroy's Executive Council from 1916 until 1921.

A younger brother was Monsignor Arthur Stapylton Barnes.

His daughter Lucy Eleanor Barnes married Charles FitzRoy, 10th Duke of Grafton in 1942.

References

External links 

 

1858 births
1946 deaths
Knights Commander of the Order of the Bath
Knights Commander of the Order of the Star of India
People educated at Eton College
Alumni of University College, Oxford
Members of the Inner Temple
Civil servants in the Board of Trade
Members of the Council of the Governor General of India
English barristers